The 1989–90 NBA season was the Clippers' 20th season in the National Basketball Association, and their 6th in Los Angeles. With the second overall pick in the 1989 NBA draft, the Clippers selected Danny Ferry out of Duke University. However, Ferry refused to play for the Clippers, and left to play overseas in Italy. This would force General Manager Elgin Baylor into trading his draft rights along with Reggie Williams to the Cleveland Cavaliers in exchange for Ron Harper. The Clippers were approaching .500 at 16–19 when Harper went down to a knee injury after 28 games. The team posted a 7-game losing streak midway through the season, and held a 21–26 record at the All-Star break. At midseason, the team acquired Winston Garland in a trade with the Golden State Warriors. The Clippers lost their final five games of the season, finishing sixth in the Pacific Division with a 30–52 record.

Despite another 50-loss season, the team's second-year stars posted stellar seasons; forward Charles D. Smith averaged 21.1 points, 6.7 rebounds and 1.5 blocks per game, while last year's top draft pick Danny Manning averaged 16.3 points and 5.9 rebounds per game, and guard Gary Grant provided the team with 13.1 points, 10.0 assists and 2.5 steals per game. In addition, Ken Norman contributed 16.1 points and 6.7 rebounds per game, and Benoit Benjamin provided with 13.5 points, 9.3 rebounds and 2.6 blocks per game.

For the season, the team slightly changed their uniforms, which remained in use until 2000.

Draft picks

Roster

Roster notes
 Point guard David Rivers became the 3rd former Laker to play with the crosstown rival Clippers.

Regular season

Season standings

z - clinched division title
y - clinched division title
x - clinched playoff spot

Record vs. opponents

Game log

Player statistics

Awards and records

Transactions
The Clippers were involved in the following transactions during the 1989–90 season.

Trades

Free agents

Additions

Subtractions

Player Transactions Citation:

References

Los Angeles Clippers seasons